Karl Foerster (March 9, 1874 - November 27, 1970) was a German gardener, nurseryman, garden writer, and garden philosopher.

Foerster helped popularize the use of grasses in garden design.

Bibliography 
 Winterharte Blütenstauden und Sträucher der Neuzeit. Verlagsbuchhandlung J.J. Weber, Leipzig 1911
 Vom Blütengarten der Zukunft. Furche Verlag Hamburg 1917, mehrere Nachauflagen beim „Verlag der Gartenschönheit“ Berlin-Westend
 Unendliche Heimat. Verlag der Gartenschönheit Berlin-Westend 1925
 Der Rittersporn. Verlag der Gartenschönheit Berlin-Westend 1928
 Garten als Zauberschlüssel. Rowohlt, Berlin 1934.
 Staudenbilderbuch. Verlag der Gartenschönheit Berlin/Bern 1935
 Der Steingarten der sieben Jahreszeiten in Sonne und Schatten: Arbeits- und Anschauungsbuch für Anfänger und Kenner. Verlag der Gartenschönheit, Berlin/Bern 1936
 Blumen auf Europas Zinnen mit Albert Steiner, Erlenbach – Zürich u. Lpz., Rotapfel-Verlag Zürich, 1936; mehrere Nachauflagen
 Gartenfreude wie noch nie. Kleines Gartenärgerlexikon. (= Bornimer Wegweiser – Folgeband), Verlag der Gartenschönheit Berlin/Bern 1937
 Glücklich durchbrochenes Schweigen. Verhüllte und unverhüllte Stichworte aus dem inneren Buchgetriebe. Rowohlt, Berlin 1937, Nachauflage bei Reclam, Leipzig 1940
 Gartenstauden-Bilderbuch. Verlag der Gartenschönheit Berlin/Bern 1938
 Das Blumenzwiebel-Buch. Verlag der Gartenschönheit Karl Specht, Berlin 1939
 Kleinstauden-Bilderbuch. Verlag der Gartenschönheit Karl Specht, Berlin 1939
 Lebende Gartentabellen. Verlag der Gartenschönheit Karl Specht, Berlin 1940, 3., aktualisierte Auflage, bearbeitet von Klaus Kaiser, bei Neumann-Verlag Radebeul 2011, und Eugen Ulmer Verlag Stuttgart 2011, 
 Kleines Bilderlexikon der Gartenpflanzen. Verlag der Gartenschönheit Karl Specht, Berlin 1941
 Von Garten, Landschaft, Mensch. Verlag der Gartenschönheit Karl Specht, Berlin 1941 (1942?)
 Blauer Schatz der Gärten: Kommende Freundschaft der Gartenmenschen mit der neuen Sphäre der Gartenfarben, dem blauen Flor der Monate von Vorfrühling bis Herbst. Reclam, Leipzig 1940; 5. Auflage, bearbeitet von Norbert Kühn, bei Eugen Ulmer Verlag, Stuttgart 2015, .
 Vom großen Welt- und Gartenspiel. Schwinn & Helène KG, Darmstadt 1950
 Neuer Glanz des Gartenjahres. Neumann Verlag Radebeul 1952 (zweite Fassung 1953). Bilder, Berichte und Erfahrungs-Tabellen aus dem Leben der winterhart ausdauernden Gewächse des Gartens. 10. Auflage, bearbeitet von Konrad Näser, bei Eugen Ulmer Verlag Stuttgart 1999, 
 Reise doch – bleibe doch! Lockungen kaum betretener Lebens- und Gartenpfade. Keppler und Scherrer Verlag Frankfurt/Main 1953
 Tröste mich – ich bin so glücklich. Worte aus dem Umgang mit Menschen, Pflanzen und Gärten. Furche Verlag Hamburg 1954, Nachauflagen beim Verlag Stichnote, Darmstadt
 Der Steingarten der sieben Jahreszeiten. 2. Fassung, bei Neumann Verlag Radebeul 1954
 Einzug der Gräser und Farne in die Gärten, sowie einiger bedeutungsvoller Blattschmuckstauden. Neumann Verlag, Radebeul 1956; 7. Auflage, bearbeitet von Bernhard Röllich, bei Eugen Ulmer Verlag, Stuttgart 1998, .
 Warnung und Ermutigung, Union Verlag, Berlin 1959, 9. Auflage bei Eugen Ulmer Verlag Stuttgart 2010, 
 Ferien vom Ach. Union Verlag, Berlin 1962; 13. Auflage bei Eugen Ulmer Verlag Stuttgart 2017, 
 Der Steingarten der sieben Jahreszeiten. 3. Fassung, bei Neumann Verlag Radebeul 1963, 13., erweiterte Auflage, bearbeitet von Bernhard Röllich, bei Eugen Ulmer Verlag Stuttgart 2018, 
 Es wird durchgeblüht. Thema mit Variationen. Union Verlag, Berlin 1968; 8. Auflage bei Eugen Ulmer Verlag, Stuttgart 2016,

References 

German gardeners